An orator is a person who speaks in public.

Orator may also refer to:

People
Attic orators

Given name
Orator Fuller Cook (1867–1949), American botanist and entomologist
Orator Henry LaCraft (1850–?), member of the South Dakota Senate
Orator Shafer (1851–1922), American baseball player

Profession or role
Public Orator, a person acting as the voice of a university

Art, entertainment, and media

Fictional characters
Orator (comics), a character in the Marvel Universe

Film
The Orator, 2011 film

Literature
Orator (Cicero), a text by Marcus Tullius Cicero written in 46 B.C.
De Oratore ("On the Orator"), a dialogue by Cicero written in 55 B.C
The Orator, a collection of short stories by Edgar Wallace

Visual art
The Orator, a Roman-Etruscan bronze sculpture from the late second century or early first century BCE

See also
Lecturer
Oratory (disambiguation)